Nuclear factor of kappa light polypeptide gene enhancer in B-cells inhibitor, epsilon, also known as NFKBIE, is a protein which in humans is encoded by the NFKBIE gene.

Function 

NFKBIE protein expression is up-regulated following NF-κB activation and during myelopoiesis.  NFKBIE is able to inhibit NF-κB-directed transactivation via cytoplasmic retention of REL proteins.

NFKB1 or NFKB2 is bound to REL, RELA, or RELB to form the NF-κB transcription factor complex. The NF-κB complex is inhibited by I-kappa-B proteins (NFKBIA or NFKBIB), which inactivate NF-kappa-B by trapping it in the cytoplasm. Phosphorylation of serine residues on the I-kappa-B proteins by kinases (IKBKA, or IKBKB) marks them for destruction via the ubiquitination pathway, thereby allowing activation of the NF-kappa-B complex. Activated NF-κB complex translocates into the nucleus and binds DNA at kappa-B-binding motifs such as 5-prime GGGRNNYYCC 3-prime or 5-prime HGGARNYYCC 3-prime (where H is A, C, or T; R is an A or G purine; and Y is a C or T pyrimidine). For some genes, activation requires NF-κB interaction with other transcription factors, such as STAT (see STAT6), AP-1 (JUN), and NFAT (see NFATC1).

Interactions
NFKBIE has been shown to interact with NFKB2, RELA, NFKB1 and REL.

References

Further reading